Dalla epiphaneus is a species of butterfly in the family Hesperiidae. It is found in Ecuador, Colombia, Peru and Bolivia.

Subspecies
Dalla epiphaneus epiphaneus - Colombia
Dalla epiphaneus anca Evans, 1955 - Peru
Dalla epiphaneus gaujoni (Mabille, 1898) - Ecuador
Dalla epiphaneus junga Evans, 1955 - Bolivia
Dalla epiphaneus limba Evans, 1955 - Peru
Dalla epiphaneus poya Evans, 1955 - Peru

References

Butterflies described in 1867
epiphaneus
Hesperiidae of South America
Taxa named by Baron Cajetan von Felder
Taxa named by Rudolf Felder